Claiborne de Borda Pell   (November 22, 1918 – January 1, 2009) was an American politician and writer who served as a U.S. Senator from Rhode Island for six terms from 1961 to 1997. He was the sponsor of the 1972 bill that reformed the Basic Educational Opportunity Grant, which provides financial aid funding to American college students; the grant was given Pell's name in 1980 in honor of his work in education legislation.

A member of the Democratic Party, Pell remains the longest serving U.S. Senator from Rhode Island in history.

Early life and education
Claiborne Pell was born on November 22, 1918, in New York City, the son of Matilda Bigelow and diplomat and congressman Herbert Pell.

Pell's family members included John Francis Hamtramck Claiborne, George Mifflin Dallas, and Nathaniel Herbert Claiborne.  He was a direct descendant of English mathematician John Pell and a descendant of Senator William C. C. Claiborne. The Congressional Record also reports that he was a direct descendant of Wampage I, a Siwanoy chieftain.

In 1927 Pell's parents divorced and his mother remarried Hugo W. Koehler of St. Louis, a commander in the United States Navy.  Following World War I, Koehler served as an Office of Naval Intelligence and State Department operative in Russia during its civil war, and later as naval attaché to Poland. Said to be the "richest officer in the Navy" during the 1920s, Koehler was rumored to be the illegitimate son of Rudolf, Crown Prince of Austria and to have assisted the Romanovs to flee the Russian Empire following the Russian Revolution of 1917. Pell was close to his stepfather, who died when Pell was 22. In later years, he made a concerted effort to determine the veracity of the rumors surrounding Koehler's past, but was only partly successful.

Pell attended St. George's School in Middletown, Rhode Island, and graduated with an Bachelor of Arts in history from Princeton University in 1940. Pell's senior thesis was titled "Macaulay and the Slavery Issue." While at Princeton, he was a member of Colonial Club and the American Whig-Cliosophic Society, and played on the rugby team.

Post-college life
After graduating from Princeton, Pell worked as an oil field roustabout in Oklahoma.  He then served as private secretary for his father, who was United States Ambassador to Portugal.  At the start of World War II he was with his father, who was then United States Ambassador to Hungary.  Claiborne Pell drove trucks carrying emergency supplies to prisoners of war in Germany, and was detained several times by the Nazi government.

Uniformed service
Pell enlisted in the U.S. Coast Guard as a seaman second class on August 12, 1941, four months before the Japanese attack on Pearl Harbor. Pell served as a ship's cook, was promoted to seaman first class on October 31, and then was commissioned as an ensign on December 17, 1941. During the war, Pell's ships served as North Atlantic convoy escorts, and also in amphibious warfare during the allied invasion of Sicily and the allied invasion of the Italian mainland.

Pell was promoted to lieutenant (junior grade) on October 1, 1942, and then to lieutenant in May 1943.  Due to his fluency in Italian, Pell was assigned as a civil affairs officer in Sicily, where he became ill from drinking unpasteurized milk.  He was sent home for recuperation during the summer of 1944, but returned to active service later in the war.  Pell was discharged from active duty on September 5, 1945.

After the end of World War II, he remained in the U.S. Coast Guard Reserve.  He attained the rank of captain and retired in 1978.

Personal life and family
In December 1944, Pell married Nuala O'Donnell, daughter of Charles Oliver O'Donnell and Josephine Hartford. They had four children: Herbert Claiborne Pell III, Christopher Thomas Hartford Pell, Nuala Dallas Pell, and Julia Lorillard Wampage Pell. Herbert (September 11, 1945 – September 24, 1999) and Julia (May 9, 1953 – April 13, 2006) predeceased their parents. His grandson Clay Pell (son of Herbert) was an unsuccessful contender in the 2014 Democratic primary for Governor of Rhode Island.

Diplomatic work, further education
From 1945 to 1952, he served in the United States Department of State as a Foreign Service Officer in Czechoslovakia, Italy, and Washington, D.C.  He was fluent in French, Italian, and Portuguese.

In 1945, Pell was a participant in the United Nations Conference on International Organization in San Francisco that drafted the United Nations Charter.

In 1946 he completed graduate studies in International Relations at Columbia University and received a Master of Arts degree.

Post-diplomatic career
In 1954 Pell was appointed vice president and member of the board of directors of the International Fiscal Corporation.  He also served as a vice president and director of the North American Newspaper Alliance. He was also a director of the Franklin D. Roosevelt Foundation, Fort Ticonderoga Association, and General Rochambeau Commission of Rhode Island.  He also served as a fundraiser and consultant for the Democratic National Committee. He served as Vice President of the International Rescue Committee. Stationed in Austria, he was responsible for assisting refugees from the Hungarian Revolution of 1956 to leave the country and resettle.

During Pell's diplomatic career and other international activities in the 1940s and 1950s, he was arrested and jailed at least six times, including detentions by both fascist and communist governments.

Political career

In 1960, Pell won the seat of retiring U.S. Senator Theodore Francis Green, defeating former Governor Dennis J. Roberts and former Governor and U.S. Senator J. Howard McGrath in the Democratic primary, and former Rhode Island Republican Party Chairman Raoul Archambault in the general election.

Despite being called "the least electable man in America" by John F. Kennedy because of his many odd habits and beliefs, Pell proved a durable politician.  He won reelection five times, including victories over Ruth M. Briggs (1966), John Chafee (1972), James G. Reynolds (1978), Barbara Leonard (1984), and Claudine Schneider (1990).

Often considered by his opponents to be too easygoing, Pell demonstrated his effectiveness as a campaigner.  During his first campaign, when he was accused of carpetbagging, Pell published newspaper advertisements featuring a photograph of his grand-uncle Duncan Pell, who had served as Lieutenant Governor of Rhode Island during the 1860s, thus demonstrating Pell's association with the state. When Briggs called him a "creampuff" during their 1966 campaign, Pell turned that to his advantage and mocked Briggs by obtaining an endorsement from a local baker's union.

During his first campaign, Pell also used his foreign experience to great advantage, impressing some largely immigrant audiences in person and on the radio by campaigning in their native languages.

Personality and beliefs
Pell was known for unusual beliefs and behaviors, including wearing threadbare suits, using public transportation and purchasing cheap used automobiles despite his wealth, and an interest in the paranormal. His interest in the paranormal is critiqued by Martin Gardner: "In my opinion, however, no one in Washington has rivaled Senator Pell in combining of science with extreme gullibility toward the performances of psychics." He also wore his father's belt as a memento, despite the fact that Herbert Pell was stouter than the rail-thin Claiborne Pell, requiring Claiborne Pell to wrap the belt around his waist twice to make it fit.

Arrest allegation
In 1972's The Washington Pay-Off, author and former lobbyist Robert N. Winter-Berger wrote about Pell's alleged arrest during a raid on a Greenwich Village homosexual bar in 1964. Pell denied the allegation and there were no police records, witness statements or other sources to corroborate Winter-Berger. Despite legal advice to sue for defamation, Pell declined, deciding that it would draw undue publicity to the allegations.

Pell education grants
Pell was largely responsible for the creation of "Basic Educational Opportunity Grants" in 1973, renamed Pell Grants in 1980, to provide financial aid funds to U.S. college students. Pell Grants initially provided for grants for prisoners, but Congress later eliminated that provision. For some years there was more money available than was applied for.

He was the main sponsor of the bill that created the National Endowment for the Arts and the National Endowment for the Humanities, and was active as an advocate for mass transportation initiatives and domestic legislation facilitating and conforming to the United Nations Convention on the Law of the Sea.

Later Senate career
Pell served as Chairman of the Senate Foreign Relations Committee from 1987 to 1995.  In 1990 he was re-elected to his sixth and last term of the Senate.

In 1996, his last year in the Senate, Pell voted against the Defense of Marriage Act, which banned the federal government from legally recognizing same-sex marriage.

Pell declined to seek re-election in 1996 and retired on January 3, 1997. Pell served in the Senate for thirty-six continuous years, making him the longest-serving U.S. Senator in the history of Rhode Island.  He was succeeded by Jack Reed.

Retirement and death
After retirement, Pell lived in Newport and was a communicant of St. Columba's Church in Middletown. He occasionally attended public functions of organizations with which he was affiliated. He was also a distinguished visiting professor at Salve Regina University.  Towards the end of his life, he was diagnosed with Parkinson's disease.

Claiborne Pell died on January 1, 2009. His funeral was held at Trinity Church in Newport.  In addition to members of his family, Pell was eulogized by former President Bill Clinton, Senator Edward Kennedy and then Vice-President elect Joe Biden.  He was buried at St. Columba's Episcopal Church (Berkeley Memorial Cemetery) in Middletown, Rhode Island, near the graves of his son Herbert and his daughter Julia, who had predeceased him.

Soon after his death, the newspaper The New York Times termed Pell "the most formidable politician in Rhode Island history."

Authorship, recognition, organizations

Published works
Senator Pell authored three books, Megalopolis Unbound: The Supercity and the Transportation of Tomorrow (1966), A Challenge of the Seven Seas (1966), (co-author), and "Power and Policy: America's Role in World Affairs" (1972).

Awards and honors
Senator Pell received more than 50 honorary college degrees, including recognition from Johnson & Wales University, the University of Vermont and the University of Massachusetts.

In 1987 Pell was among those selected for the United Nations Environment Programme's Global 500 Roll of Honour, during the first year that award was established.

In 1988, Pell received the Foreign Language Advocacy Award from the Northeast Conference on the Teaching of Foreign Languages in recognition of his work in establishing the NEA, the NEH, and the Pell Grant Program.

On October 14, 1994, President Bill Clinton presented Pell with the Presidential Citizens Medal.

Rhode Island's Newport Bridge was renamed the Claiborne Pell Bridge and the Pell Center of International Relations and Public Policy was established at Salve Regina University.  In addition, Newport's Claiborne Pell Elementary School, which opened in 2013, was named in his honor.

Pell was a Chevalier of the French Legion of Honor.  He also received the Knight Grand Cross of the Order of the Crown of Italy.

His awards for service in the Coast Guard during the Second World War included the American Defense Service Medal, American Campaign Medal, European-African-Middle Eastern Campaign Medal and the World War Two Victory Medal.

Memberships
Pell was a member of the Rhode Island Society of the Cincinnati. Pell was also an honorary life member of the Rhode Island Society of Colonial Wars as well as a member of Spouting Rock Beach Association (Bailey's Beach) and the Newport Reading Room.

Honors
  Presidential Citizens Medal (1994)
  American Defense Service Medal
  American Campaign Medal
  European-African-Middle Eastern Campaign Medal
  World War II Victory Medal
  Grand Cross of the Order of Christ, Portugal (May 31, 1979)
  Grand Cross of the Order of Merit, Portugal (October 7, 1994)
  Knight Grand Cross, Order of the Crown of Italy
  Chevalier, Legion of Honor (France)

References

External links

 Claiborne Pell at Congressional Biographical Directory
 
 New England Cable News, Video, Bill Clinton Eulogy, Something 'magical' about Claiborne Pell, January 5, 2009
 WPRI-TV, Video, Joe Biden Eulogy, VP-Elect Joe Biden Eulogizes Sen. Pell, January 5, 2009
 WPRI-TV, Video, Ted Kennedy Eulogy, Sen. Kennedy eulogizes former Sen. Pell, January 5, 2009
 WPRI-TV, Video, Jack Reed Eulogy, Sen. Reed: Pell Was Ideal Public Servant, January 5, 2009
 , Sen. Sheldon Whitehouse, January 5, 2009.
 

|-

|-

|-

|-

1918 births
2009 deaths
20th-century American politicians
American diplomats
Burials in Rhode Island
Democratic Party United States senators from Rhode Island
Recipients of the Legion of Honour
Military personnel from New York City
People educated at Gibbs School
Politicians from New York City
Politicians from Newport, Rhode Island
Presidential Citizens Medal recipients
Princeton University alumni
Rhode Island Democrats
School of International and Public Affairs, Columbia University alumni
St. George's School (Rhode Island) alumni
United States Coast Guard captains
United States Coast Guard personnel of World War II
United States Coast Guard reservists
United States Department of State officials
Chairmen of the Senate Committee on Foreign Relations
American people of English descent
Claiborne family
Pell family